Oz Peretz (born 19 April 1994) is an Israeli footballer who currently plays for Hapoel Petah Tikva.

Notes

1994 births
Living people
Israeli footballers
Maccabi Petah Tikva F.C. players
Hapoel Acre F.C. players
Hapoel Ramat Gan F.C. players
Hapoel Kfar Saba F.C. players
Hapoel Hadera F.C. players
Hapoel Ashkelon F.C. players
Hapoel Petah Tikva F.C. players
F.C. Kafr Qasim players
Hapoel Nir Ramat HaSharon F.C. players
Israeli Premier League players
Footballers from Beersheba
Israeli people of Moroccan-Jewish descent
Israel under-21 international footballers
Association football forwards